The Ambassador Extraordinary and Plenipotentiary of Ukraine to the United States of America is the ambassador of Ukraine to the United States. On 25 February 2021 Ukrainian President Volodymyr Zelenskyy appointed Oksana Markarova Ambassador of Ukraine to the United States.

The first Ukrainian ambassador to the United States assumed his post in 1992, the same year the Ukrainian Embassy, Washington, D.C., was opened.

List of ambassadors

See also
 Ukraine–United States relations
 Embassy of Ukraine, Washington, D.C.
 Embassy of the United States, Kyiv
 Ambassadors of the United States to Ukraine

References

External links
  Embassy of Ukraine to the United States of America: Previous Ambassadors

 
United States
Ukraine